is a Japanese voice actress in Japan. She is represented by Ogipro THE NEXT.

Filmography

Anime
2006
Binbō Shimai Monogatari: Shima Ōshiro
Hell Girl: Two Mirrors: Kikuri
Lovedol ~Lovely Idol~: Ruri Fujisawa
Magikano: Chiaki Yoshikawa
REC: Aka Onda

2007
Kaze no Stigma: Ayumi Tsuwabuki
Kisaragi: Kisaragi Miki

2008
Hell Girl: Three Vessels: Kikuri

2009
Miracle Train: Akari

2010
Durarara!!

2013
Hyperdimension Neptunia: The Animation: Compa
Muromi-san: Harpy

Video games
REC ☁EDokiDoki Seiyū Paradise ☁E: Aka Onda 
Ar Nosurge: Shurelia
Ar tonelico: Melody of Elemia: Shurelia 
Ar tonelico II: Melody of Metafalica: Shurelia
Hyperdevotion Noire: Goddess Black Heart: Compa 
Cross Edge: Shurelia
Hyperdimension Neptunia: Compa
Hyperdimension Neptunia Mk2: Compa
Hyperdimension Neptunia Re;Birth1: Compa
Hyperdimension Neptunia Re;Birth2: Sisters Generation: Compa
Hyperdimension Neptunia Victory: Compa
Megadimension Neptunia VII: Compa
Memories Off: Yubikiri no Kioku: Lisa Caycy Foster

Drama CD
REC Volume 1: Aka Onda 
REC Volume 2: Aka Onda

References

External links
 Kana Sakai's blog 
 

1986 births
Living people
Voice actresses from Fukuoka Prefecture
Voice actors from Fukuoka
Japanese voice actresses
Japanese video game actresses